Christina Westrum Pedersen (born 9 April 1981) is a Norwegian football referee.

She took up refereeing in 1997 and has officiated in the Toppserien since 2005. She resides in Åndalsnes, and represents Åndalsnes IF.

Pedersen officiated at the 2010 FIFA U-20 Women's World Cup, 2011 FIFA Women's World Cup and the 2012 Summer Olympics.

During the 2012 Summer Olympics, Pedersen officiated the semi-final match between Canada and the United States. In the 78th minute, a controversial delay of game call was made against the Canadian goalkeeper, Erin McLeod, when she held the ball longer than the allowed six seconds. This violation is rarely called in international play, or at any other level of soccer, and is only intended to be used during instances of clear and deliberate time-wasting. As a result, the American side was awarded a rare indirect free-kick in the box, in the eightieth minute, with Canada leading the match 3–2. On the ensuing play, another controversial handball call was made against the Canadian side, awarding the American team a penalty kick, which Abby Wambach converted to tie the game at 3–3. The Americans went on to win the match in extra time, advancing to the gold medal match. After the match, Canada forward Christine Sinclair stated, "the ref decided the result before the game started." FIFA responded by saying it was considering disciplinary action against Sinclair, but that any disciplinary action would be postponed until after the end of the tournament. Sinclair was eventually suspended for four games for her conduct.

Pedersen was not selected to referee at any major international competition since the incident.

References 

1981 births
Living people
Norwegian football referees
Women association football referees
FIFA Women's World Cup referees
Olympic football referees
Football referees at the 2012 Summer Olympics
People from Møre og Romsdal
Women referees and umpires